The Yellow Medicine River is a tributary of the Minnesota River,  long, in southwestern Minnesota in the United States.

It flows initially northeastwardly as an intermittent stream, past Ivanhoe.

The Yellow Medicine River's largest tributaries are the North Branch Yellow Medicine River and the South Branch Yellow Medicine River, both of which flow for most of their lengths on the Coteau.

The Minnesota Pollution Control Agency statistically combines the watershed of the Yellow Medicine River with that of Hawk Creek on the opposite bank of the Minnesota River, as well as small watersheds of nearby Minnesota River tributaries. According to the agency, 81% of the land in the Yellow Medicine-Hawk Creek watersheds is used for agriculture, with corn and soybeans being the predominant crops. In May 2008 19 year-old
Brandon Swanson went missing from Porter, Minnesota. Believing that he was near the town of Lynd. It was and still is highly theorized that Brandon may have slipped and fallen into the Yellow medicine river. However, nothing was found when the river was searched for over 30 days.

Flow rate
The highest recorded flow during the period was 17,200 ft³/s (487 m³/s) on April 10, 1969. Readings of zero were recorded on numerous days during several years.

See also
List of rivers in Minnesota

References

Rivers of Minnesota
Tributaries of the Minnesota River
Rivers of Lincoln County, Minnesota
Rivers of Lyon County, Minnesota
Rivers of Yellow Medicine County, Minnesota